There are 34 known isotopes of krypton (36Kr) with atomic mass numbers from 69 through 102. Naturally occurring krypton is made of five stable isotopes and one which is slightly radioactive with an extremely long half-life, plus traces of radioisotopes that are produced by cosmic rays in the atmosphere.

List of isotopes 

|-
| 69Kr
| style="text-align:right" | 36
| style="text-align:right" | 33
| 68.96518(43)#
| 32(10) ms
| β+
| 69Br
| 5/2−#
|
|
|-
| 70Kr
| style="text-align:right" | 36
| style="text-align:right" | 34
| 69.95526(41)#
| 52(17) ms
| β+
| 70Br
| 0+
|
|
|-
| rowspan=2|71Kr
| rowspan=2 style="text-align:right" | 36
| rowspan=2 style="text-align:right" | 35
| rowspan=2|70.94963(70)
| rowspan=2|100(3) ms
| β+ (94.8%)
| 71Br
| rowspan=2|(5/2)−
| rowspan=2|
| rowspan=2|
|-
| β+, p (5.2%)
| 70Se
|-
| 72Kr
| style="text-align:right" | 36
| style="text-align:right" | 36
| 71.942092(9)
| 17.16(18) s
| β+
| 72Br
| 0+
|
|
|-
| rowspan=2|73Kr
| rowspan=2 style="text-align:right" | 36
| rowspan=2 style="text-align:right" | 37
| rowspan=2|72.939289(7)
| rowspan=2|28.6(6) s
| β+ (99.32%)
| 73Br
| rowspan=2|3/2−
| rowspan=2|
| rowspan=2|
|-
| β+, p (.68%)
| 72Se
|-
| style="text-indent:1em" | 73mKr
| colspan="3" style="text-indent:2em" | 433.66(12) keV
| 107(10) ns
|
|
| (9/2+)
|
|
|-
| 74Kr
| style="text-align:right" | 36
| style="text-align:right" | 38
| 73.9330844(22)
| 11.50(11) min
| β+
| 74Br
| 0+
|
|
|-
| 75Kr
| style="text-align:right" | 36
| style="text-align:right" | 39
| 74.930946(9)
| 4.29(17) min
| β+
| 75Br
| 5/2+
|
|
|-
| 76Kr
| style="text-align:right" | 36
| style="text-align:right" | 40
| 75.925910(4)
| 14.8(1) h
| β+
| 76Br
| 0+
|
|
|-
| 77Kr
| style="text-align:right" | 36
| style="text-align:right" | 41
| 76.9246700(21)
| 74.4(6) min
| β+
| 77Br
| 5/2+
|
|
|-
| 78Kr
| style="text-align:right" | 36
| style="text-align:right" | 42
| 77.9203648(12)
| align=center|9.2   y
|Double EC
|78Se
| 0+
| 0.00355(3)
|
|-
| 79Kr
| style="text-align:right" | 36
| style="text-align:right" | 43
| 78.920082(4)
| 35.04(10) h
| β+
| 79Br
| 1/2−
|
|
|-
| style="text-indent:1em" | 79mKr
| colspan="3" style="text-indent:2em" | 129.77(5) keV
| 50(3) s
|
|
| 7/2+
|
|
|-
| 80Kr
| style="text-align:right" | 36
| style="text-align:right" | 44
| 79.9163790(16)
| colspan=3 align=center|Stable
| 0+
| 0.02286(10)
|
|-
| 81Kr
| style="text-align:right" | 36
| style="text-align:right" | 45
| 80.9165920(21)
| 2.29(11)×105 y
| EC
| 81Br
| 7/2+
|trace
|
|-
| rowspan=2 style="text-indent:1em" | 81mKr
| rowspan=2 colspan="3" style="text-indent:2em" | 190.62(4) keV
| rowspan=2|13.10(3) s
| IT (99.975%)
| 81Kr
| rowspan=2|1/2−
| rowspan=2|
| rowspan=2|
|-
| EC (.025%)
| 81Br
|-
| 82Kr
| style="text-align:right" | 36
| style="text-align:right" | 46
| 81.9134836(19)
| colspan=3 align=center|Stable
| 0+
| 0.11593(31)
|
|-
| 83Kr
| style="text-align:right" | 36
| style="text-align:right" | 47
| 82.914136(3)
| colspan=3 align=center|Stable
| 9/2+
| 0.11500(19)
|
|-
| style="text-indent:1em" | 83m1Kr
| colspan="3" style="text-indent:2em" | 9.4053(8) keV
| 154.4(11) ns
|
|
| 7/2+
|
|
|-
| style="text-indent:1em" | 83m2Kr
| colspan="3" style="text-indent:2em" | 41.5569(10) keV
| 1.83(2) h
| IT
| 83Kr
| 1/2−
|
|
|-
| 84Kr
| style="text-align:right" | 36
| style="text-align:right" | 48
| 83.911507(3)
| colspan=3 align=center|Stable
| 0+
| 0.56987(15)
|
|-
| style="text-indent:1em" | 84mKr
| colspan="3" style="text-indent:2em" | 3236.02(18) keV
| 1.89(4) µs
|
|
| 8+
|
|
|-
| 85Kr
| style="text-align:right" | 36
| style="text-align:right" | 49
| 84.9125273(21)
| 10.776(3) y
| β−
| 85Rb
| 9/2+
|trace
|
|-
| rowspan=2 style="text-indent:1em" | 85m1Kr
| rowspan=2 colspan="3" style="text-indent:2em" | 304.871(20) keV
| rowspan=2|4.480(8) h
| β− (78.6%)
| 85Rb
| rowspan=2|1/2−
| rowspan=2|
| rowspan=2|
|-
| IT (21.4%)
| 85Kr
|-
| style="text-indent:1em" | 85m2Kr
| colspan="3" style="text-indent:2em" | 1991.8(13) keV
| 1.6(7) µs[1.2(+10-4) µs]
|
|
| (17/2+)
|
|
|-
| 86Kr
| style="text-align:right" | 36
| style="text-align:right" | 50
| 85.91061073(11)
| colspan=3 align=center|Observationally Stable
| 0+
| 0.17279(41)
|
|-
| 87Kr
| style="text-align:right" | 36
| style="text-align:right" | 51
| 86.91335486(29)
| 76.3(5) min
| β−
| 87Rb
| 5/2+
|
|
|-
| 88Kr
| style="text-align:right" | 36
| style="text-align:right" | 52
| 87.914447(14)
| 2.84(3) h
| β−
| 88Rb
| 0+
|
|
|-
| 89Kr
| style="text-align:right" | 36
| style="text-align:right" | 53
| 88.91763(6)
| 3.15(4) min
| β−
| 89Rb
| 3/2(+#)
|
|
|-
| 90Kr
| style="text-align:right" | 36
| style="text-align:right" | 54
| 89.919517(20)
| 32.32(9) s
| β−
| 90mRb
| 0+
|
|
|-
| 91Kr
| style="text-align:right" | 36
| style="text-align:right" | 55
| 90.92345(6)
| 8.57(4) s
| β−
| 91Rb
| 5/2(+)
|
|
|-
| rowspan=2|92Kr
| rowspan=2 style="text-align:right" | 36
| rowspan=2 style="text-align:right" | 56
| rowspan=2|91.926156(13)
| rowspan=2|1.840(8) s
| β− (99.96%)
| 92Rb
| rowspan=2|0+
| rowspan=2|
| rowspan=2|
|-
| β−, n (.033%)
| 91Rb
|-
| rowspan=2|93Kr
| rowspan=2 style="text-align:right" | 36
| rowspan=2 style="text-align:right" | 57
| rowspan=2|92.93127(11)
| rowspan=2|1.286(10) s
| β− (98.05%)
| 93Rb
| rowspan=2|1/2+
| rowspan=2|
| rowspan=2|
|-
| β−, n (1.95%)
| 92Rb
|-
| rowspan=2|94Kr
| rowspan=2 style="text-align:right" | 36
| rowspan=2 style="text-align:right" | 58
| rowspan=2|93.93436(32)#
| rowspan=2|210(4) ms
| β− (94.3%)
| 94Rb
| rowspan=2|0+
| rowspan=2|
| rowspan=2|
|-
| β−, n (5.7%)
| 93Rb
|-
| 95Kr
| style="text-align:right" | 36
| style="text-align:right" | 59
| 94.93984(43)#
| 114(3) ms
| β−
| 95Rb
| 1/2(+)
|
|
|-
| 96Kr
| style="text-align:right" | 36
| style="text-align:right" | 60
| 95.942998(62)
| 80(7) ms
| β−
| 96Rb
| 0+
|
|
|-
| rowspan=2|97Kr
| rowspan=2 style="text-align:right" | 36
| rowspan=2 style="text-align:right" | 61
| rowspan=2|96.94856(54)#
| rowspan=2|63(4) ms
| β−
| 97Rb
| rowspan=2|3/2+#
| rowspan=2|
| rowspan=2|
|-
| β−, n
| 96Rb
|-
| 98Kr
| style="text-align:right" | 36
| style="text-align:right" | 62
| 97.95191(64)#
| 46(8) ms
|
|
| 0+
|
|
|-
| 99Kr
| style="text-align:right" | 36
| style="text-align:right" | 63
| 98.95760(64)#
| 40(11) ms
|
|
| (3/2+)#
|
|
|-
| 100Kr
| style="text-align:right" | 36
| style="text-align:right" | 64
| 99.96114(54)#
| 10# ms[>300 ns]
|
|
| 0+
|
|
|-
| rowspan=3 | 101Kr
| rowspan=3 | 36
| rowspan=3 | 65
| rowspan=3 | unknown
| rowspan=3 | >635 ns
| β−, 2n
| 99Rb
| rowspan=3 | unknown
| rowspan=3 |
| rowspan=3 |
|-
| β−, n
| 100Rb
|-
| β−
| 101Rb
|-
| 102Kr
| style="text-align:right" | 36
| style="text-align:right" | 66
| 
| 
|
|
| 0+
|
|

 The isotopic composition refers to that in air.

Notable isotopes

Krypton-81 

Radioactive krypton-81 is the product of spallation reactions with cosmic rays striking gases present in the Earth atmosphere, along with the six stable or nearly stable krypton isotopes. Krypton-81 has a half-life of about 229,000 years.

Krypton-81 is used for dating ancient (50,000- to 800,000-year-old) groundwater and to determine their residence time in deep aquifers. One of the main technical limitation of the method is that it requires to sample very large volumes of water: several hundred liters or a few cubic meters of water. This is particularly challenging for dating pore water in deep clay aquitards with very low hydraulic conductivity.

Krypton-85 

Krypton-85 is a radioisotope of krypton that has a half-life of about 10.75 years. This isotope is produced by the nuclear fission of uranium and plutonium in nuclear weapons testing and in nuclear reactors, as well as by cosmic rays. An important goal of the Limited Nuclear Test Ban Treaty of 1963 was to eliminate the release of such radioisotopes into the atmosphere, and since 1963 much of that krypton-85 has had time to decay. However, it is inevitable that krypton-85 is released during the reprocessing of fuel rods from nuclear reactors.

Atmospheric concentration 

The atmospheric concentration of krypton-85 around the North Pole is about 30 percent higher than that at the Amundsen–Scott South Pole Station  because nearly all of the world's nuclear reactors and all of its major nuclear reprocessing plants are located in the northern hemisphere, and also well-north of the equator.
To be more specific, those nuclear reprocessing plants with significant capacities are located in the United States, the United Kingdom, the French Republic, the Russian Federation, Mainland China (PRC), Japan, India, and Pakistan.

Krypton-86 

Krypton-86 was formerly used to define the meter from 1960 until 1983, when the definition of the meter was based on the wavelength of the 606 nm (orange) spectral line of a krypton-86 atom.

Others 

All other radioisotopes of krypton have half-lives of less than one day, except for krypton-79, a positron emitter with a half-life of about 35.0 hours.

References

 Isotope masses from:

 Isotopic compositions and standard atomic masses from:

 Half-life, spin, and isomer data selected from the following sources.

External links
 Brookhaven National Laboratory: Krypton-101 information 

 
Krypton
Krypton